Classic Rock (formerly The Classic Rock Experience prior to 2011) was a 24-hour music format produced by Cumulus Media Networks (now Westwood One). It drew an adult mainstream audience between the ages of 25-49 with classic rock music from artists such as Aerosmith, The Allman Brothers Band, The Beatles, Phil Collins, Deep Purple, The Eagles, Jimi Hendrix, Pink Floyd, Queen, and The Rolling Stones.

The DJ line-up included Chaz Mixon, Michelle Michaels, Frank Welch, Jeff Davis, Debbie Douglas, Scott Manning, and Dave Bolt.

History 
The Classic Rock Experience was first aired in 1972 by Satellite Music Network (SMN) and has since then maintained its classic rock format to this day. ABC Radio (now Cumulus Media Networks) acquired this network from SMN in 1989.

In May 2014, it was announced that the "Classic Rock" satellite format has been discontinued after the merger of Cumulus Media Networks and Westwood One.

Sample hour of programming
"Brown Sugar" - The Rolling Stones
"Money" - Pink Floyd
"We Will Rock You"/"We Are The Champions" - Queen
"Purple Haze" - The Jimi Hendrix Experience
"Slow Ride" - Foghat
"Don't Stop Believin'" - Journey
"Old Time Rock and Roll" - Bob Seger & The Silver Bullet Band
"In The Air Tonight" - Phil Collins
"Won't Get Fooled Again" - The Who
"Smoke on the Water" - Deep Purple
"Walk This Way" - Aerosmith
"Kashmir" - Led Zeppelin

Affiliates
This is a partial list.
Rock Springs, Wyoming - KSIT
Tatum, New Mexico - KTUM

References

Classic rock radio stations in the United States
Westwood One
Defunct radio networks in the United States
Former subsidiaries of The Walt Disney Company
Radio stations established in 1972 
Radio stations disestablished in 2014
Defunct radio stations in the United States